F.D. Roosevelt Teaching Hospital with Policlinic Banska Bystrica is a major hospital serving the area of central Slovakia. It consists of 11 clinics.

History
The hospital was founded in 1900 as City Hospital of Banska Bystrica. It had 125 beds and its first head physician was Dr. Rajčič, who is also considered hospital's founder.

After WWII the hospital was renamed to F.D. Roosevelt Hospital. The current premises with over 1,100 beds were built in 1968.

References

Banská Bystrica
Hospitals in Slovakia
Medical education in Slovakia
Teaching hospitals
Hospitals established in 1900
1900 establishments in Austria-Hungary